Lisa and the Devil is a 1974 horror film directed by Mario Bava. The film was first released in Spain as El diablo se lleva a los muertos (The Devil Takes the Dead) and stars Elke Sommer as a young tourist who loses her way in Toledo and spends the night at a villa belonging to a family of mysterious Spanish aristocrats.

After the popularity of the film The Exorcist, scenes were added by producer Alfredo Leone and Lamberto Bava which gave the film an exorcism theme and re-released it as The House of Exorcism (Italian: La casa dell'esorcismo) in the United States; this recasts the film as a clone of The Exorcist, with the main character possessed and recounting to the priest who is seeking to save her the story of how she became possessed.

Plot 
Tourist Lisa Reiner wanders away from her tour group in Toledo to go shopping inside a store, where she encounters a man named Leandro, who is purchasing a dummy and a carousel Lisa attempts to buy. Due to his resemblance to the portrait of the Devil in a fresco she has just seen, Lisa flees, only to be confronted by a mustachioed gentleman who falls from a flight of stairs to his apparent death.

When she fails to return to the tour group, she takes refuge with a couple and their driver, who agree to help Lisa get to her hotel. But their car breaks down in front of a crumbling mansion where Lisa discovers that Leandro works as the butler. The couple (a young woman and older man) persuade Leandro to let them stay while the driver (the young wife's lover) fixes the car. Lisa attempts to flee, but Maximilian, a resident of the mansion, stops Lisa and agrees to let the three stay over his mother's objections, a blind Countess.

The obscure, mustachioed man continues to stalk Lisa as further mysteries unfold: the Countess and her son have a fourth guest in the mansion. This mysterious figure is held prisoner inside a secret room. The Countess, Maximilian, Leandro, and the mustachioed man (revealed to be Carlos, the Countess' second husband) claim that Lisa is actually Elena, Maximilian's long-lost girlfriend who was once frightened away by his jealous mother.

Through a series of waking dreams, it is revealed that Elena was secretly sleeping with Carlos and that he was plotting to leave the jealous and reclusive Countess. Lisa freaks out after seeing Leandro preparing Carlos' body for burial juxtaposed with Carlos being alive. Carlos attempts to whisk Lisa away one last time, but Maximilian kills him. Lisa faints as Carlos' body morphs into the dummy Leandro purchased in the store. Leandro repairs the dummy (whose face has caved in, in the aftermath of the murder attempt).

A mysterious figure promptly kills the driver after fixing the car. Leandro offers to cover up the crime to his employers so long as they let him dispose of the body. When the husband demands his wife leave with him, she runs over him, only to be brutally murdered by Maximilian.

While Lisa is unconscious, Leandro dresses her like Elena. He gives a speech about how he is a demon indebted to the Countess and her son. The mansion is cursed, and the Countess, her son, the couple, their driver, and Elena are forced to relive their deaths again and again, with dummies being procured by the demon to represent the players as they repeat the cycle of death. Lisa's arrival ultimately negated his inability to find a Lisa dummy to represent her in this latest incarnation.

Lisa wakes up and finds the Countess, who has discovered the young wife's corpse. Lisa intends to escape, but a defeated and browbeaten Maximilian has started to believe that Lisa is just like Elena. He takes her to his secret room, where Elena's corpse and ghost are revealed to be the mystery prisoner. Maximilian drugs Lisa, strips her naked, and rapes her, only to have the ghost of Elena laugh at him mid-rape and cause him to stop. Furious, he goes downstairs and confesses his crimes to his mother, who wants him to kill Lisa to keep anyone from finding out what he has done.

Maximilian reveals to his mother his crimes: having murdered his stepfather to avenge his betrayal of the Countess and his stepson, Maximilian then imprisoned Elena rather than risk allowing her to leave and inform the police. Maximilian kills his mother when he realizes that she will never let him leave her or allow him to have a relationship with Lisa.

After doing so, Maximilian is shocked to find all of his victims (the married couple, their driver, and Elena) waiting for him at a table. His mother reappears in the state she was murdered, and as his mother attempts to kill him, Maximilian falls from a window and is impaled on the metal fence below. Leandro reveals himself behind the corpses making their appearance and says that Maximilian "accidentally slipped."

Lisa wakes up the next morning, naked, with the mansion in ruins. She finds the dummy representing Maximilian, beseeching her to stay. Later in town, she runs into Leandro, who is presented with an "Elena" doll by the shopkeeper. Leandro refuses the doll as Lisa boards her plane, intending to leave Spain. The entire plane turns out to be empty. She discovers the corpse of the men and women she met the previous night. Rushing to find the pilot, she discovers him to be Leandro. Lisa collapses, reverting to a dummy, as it is implied that Lisa was some form of reincarnation/dummy doppelganger of Elena and that Leandro has reclaimed her.

Cast 

 Telly Savalas as Leandro
 Elke Sommer as Lisa Reiner/Elena
 Sylva Koscina as Sophia Lehar
 Alessio Orano as Maximilian
 Alida Valli as Countess
 Gabriele Tinti as George
 Kathy Leone as Lisa's Friend
 Eduardo Fajardo as Francis Lehar
 Franz von Treuberg as Shopkeeper
 Espartaco Santoni as Carlo
Additional cast members for The House of Exorcism
 Robert Alda as Father Michael
 Carmen Silva as Anna

Production
Lisa and the Devil was the second film director Mario Bava made with producer Alfredo Leone, who gave Bava complete control to make any kind of film he wanted after working on Baron Blood. Along with Giorgio Maulini, Romano Migliorini, Roberto Natale and Maulini's girlfriend Francesca Rusicka created a story for the film. Rusicka was a non-professional and remain uncredited for her contributions to the film. The film began shooting under the title Il diavolo e i morti in Spain from early September to late November 1972. According to Lamberto Bava, some lines of dialogue in the film were lifted verbatim from Dostoyevsky's novel The Demons. The story and screenplay is credited to Mario Bava and Alfredo Leone in the International version of Lisa and the Devil, while the Italian version includes Maulini, Migliorini, and Natale.

Release
Lisa and the Devil was first shown at the Cannes Film Market on 9 May 1973. Italian film critic and historian Roberto Curti described this screening as "disastrous". Lisa and the Devil was submitted to the Italian film censors in November 1973 which had an 86-minute and 25 second running time, a shorter version than the Spanish theatrical release. Lisa and the Devil was released theatrically in Spain on 25 November 1974 in Barcelona. The film was released in Madrid in March 1975. The Spanish cut included a gorier version of Koscina's death scene and shortened sex scenes and part of the ending edited out. The Lisa and the Devil version never received a theatrical release in Italy in its original form.
 
After the wide popularity of the film The Exorcist, Alfredo Leone approached Mario Bava about adding exorcism scenes to the film. Mario said if he wanted to do that for the American market, it would be fine and sent his son Lamberto to assist him. The new version, titled The House of Exorcism, adds a framing story of Father Michael, an exorcist played by Robert Alda. This also includes more gruesome killings and more risque footage of Elke Sommer. Leone has stated that the additional scenes were shot by both Mario and himself. Lamberto stated that "Some stuff in La casa dell'esorcismo was directed by Leone, whereas other scenes, I taught him how to make them, technically speaking" When asked about the film in May 1976, Mario Bava stated that the film was not his "even though it bears my signature. It is the same situation, too long to explain, of a cuckolded father who finds himself with a child that is not his own, and with his name, and cannot do anything about it."

The House of Exorcism was released in Italy as La casa dell'esoercismo on 2 April 1975 where it was distributed by Transeuropa. The film grossed a total of 90,939,354 Italian lire in Italy. The House of Exorcism was released in the United States on 9 July 1976, where it was distributed by Peppercorn-Wormser Film Enterprises.

Critical reception 
From retrospective reviews, AllMovie commented on Lisa and the Devil noting that "Bava's original cut is confusing at times, but it is far better than the 'possession' theme that was oddly spliced into House." Marco Lanzagorta of PopMatters gave the movie eight stars out of ten, stating "By showcasing a dream-like imagery and lyrical storyline, Lisa and the Devil may not be an easy film to watch. This is a gorgeous film that takes place in a metaphysical hell where logic breaks down in nightmarish ways. But then again, its completely ambiguous storyline leaves the viewer pondering long after it's over. Mysterious, creepy, and beautiful, Lisa and the Devil is required viewing for the serious horror fan."

Footnotes

References

External links 
 
 
 

1974 horror films
1974 films
Films directed by Mario Bava
Films scored by Carlo Savina
Films set in country houses
Films shot in Barcelona
Films shot in Madrid
Italian horror films
Gothic horror films
Italian supernatural horror films
West German films
Spanish horror films
German horror films
Mannequins in films
Spanish supernatural horror films
1970s Italian films
1970s German films
1970s Spanish films
Films set in Toledo, Spain